Raorchestes griet is a species of frog in the family Rhacophoridae. It is endemic to the Western Ghats south of the Palghat Gap in Kerala and Tamil Nadu states, India. Common name Griet bush frog has been coined for it.

Description
Adult males measure  and adult females, based on a single specimen,  in snout–vent length. The snout is rounded. The tympanum is indistinct, but the supratympanic fold is prominent. The fingers have well-developed discs and dermal fringes but no webbing. The toes have discs and rudimentary webbing. Skin of snout bears small horny spines, and there are horny ridges between eyes, arranged in triangle. Dorsal skin is covered with small horny spines. The dorsum is light greyish brown, light brownish grey, or light-reddish brown. Dark or light red markings may be present.

Habitat and conservation
It is nocturnal and arboreal. Males call from ground level up to two metres above the ground.

This species can be locally abundant, but it is threatened by habitat fragmentation.

References

griet
Endemic fauna of the Western Ghats
Frogs of India
Amphibians described in 2002
Taxonomy articles created by Polbot